The Honourable Dr. Garth Alfred Taylor, OJ, Ph.D. (April 29, 1944 – November 19, 2005) was a Jamaican ophthalmologist, professor, and humanitarian.

Born in Montego Bay, Taylor was a Queen's Scout in his youth. He received his education at Cornwall College in Jamaica and Queen's University in Ontario. He later became an associate professor of ophthalmology at the latter institution, as well as chief of ophthalmology at Cornwall Community Hospital in Canada.

Taylor was also the vice-president of ORBIS Canada, a charity devoted to preventing and correcting avoidable cases of blindness in the developing world, and the co-founder of Canadian Surgical Eye Expeditions (CANSEE), another charitable organization devoted to the same purpose. Working out of a McDonnell Douglas DC-10 airplane converted into a mobile field hospital, he performed more than 1,000 charitable eye operations in more than 60 different countries, during more than 100 separate surgical missions. Taylor also provided on-site training for local doctors in cornea, cataract and refractive procedures. For his efforts, he was honored with the Order of Jamaica in 2005.

Taylor and his wife Beverly had two children: a daughter, Leanne, and a son, Gregory. He died unexpectedly on November 19, 2005, as the result of an aortic aneurysm.

External links
ORBIS International
Canadian Surgical Eye Expeditions (CANSEE)

References

1944 births
2005 deaths
People from Montego Bay
Jamaican ophthalmologists
Queen's University at Kingston alumni
Academic staff of Queen's University at Kingston
Deaths from aortic aneurysm
Members of the Order of Jamaica
Cornwall College, Jamaica alumni